The Shanty Brook flows into the Sacandaga River east of Speculator, New York.

References 

Rivers of Hamilton County, New York
Rivers of New York (state)
Tributaries of the Sacandaga River